The Buber-Rosenzweig-Medaille is an annual prize awarded since 1968 by the Deutscher Koordinierungsrat der Gesellschaften für Christlich-Jüdische Zusammenarbeit
(DKR; German Coordinating Council of Societies for Christian-Jewish Cooperation) to individuals, initiatives, or institutions, which have actively contributed to Christian–Jewish understanding. Forty-four different societies belong to the DKR. The name of the prize honors the memory of the Austrian-Jewish philosopher, translator, and educator Martin Buber (1878–1965) and the German-Jewish theologian Franz Rosenzweig (1886–1929). In its inaugural year, the prize was granted to both the historian Friedrich Heer (Gottes erste Liebe; God's First Love) and the Protestant theologian Friedrich-Wilhelm Marquardt (Die Entdeckung des Judentums für die christliche Theologie: Israel im Denken Karl Barths; The Discovery of Judaism for Christian Theology: Israel in the Thought of Karl Barth).

Recipients
1968 Friedrich Heer, Vienna / Friedrich-Wilhelm Marquardt, Berlin
1969 Ernst Simon, Jerusalem
1970 Eva Gabriele Reichmann, London / Rabbi Robert Raphael Geis, Düsseldorf
1971 Bishop Kurt Scharf, Berlin
1972 Monsignor Antonius Cornelis Ramselaar, Utrecht
1973 Helmut Gollwitzer, Berlin
1974 Hans G. Adler, London
1975 Archbishop George Appleton, Jerusalem and Wantage / Abbot Laurentius Klein, Jerusalem
1976 Ernst-Ludwig Ehrlich, Basel
1977 Friedrich Dürrenmatt
1978 Grete Schaeder, Göttingen / Albrecht Goes, Stuttgart
1979 Manès Sperber, Paris / James Parkes, Southampton
1980 Eugen Kogon, Königstein / Gertrud Luckner, Freiburg im Breisgau
1981 Isaac Bashevis Singer, New York
1982 Schalom Ben-Chorin, Jerusalem
1983 Helene Jacobs, Berlin
1984 Siegfried Theodor Arndt, Leipzig / Helmut Eschwege, Dresden
1985 Franz Mußner, Passau
1986 Heinz Kremers, Duisburg
1987 Neve Shalom, Israel
1988 Israel Studies Working Group
1989 Yehudi Menuhin
1990 Charlotte Petersen, Dillenburg
1991 Leo Baeck Education Center, Haifa
1992 Hildegard Hamm-Brücher, Munich / Annemarie Renger, Bonn
1993 Aktion Sühnezeichen Friedensdienste (ASF) (Action Reconciliation/Service For Peace, ARSP)
1994 Jakob Petuchowski, Cincinnati) / Clemens Thoma, Lucerne)
1995 Richard von Weizsäcker, Berlin
1996 Franklin Hamlin Littell, United States / Joseph Walk, Jerusalem
1997 Hans Koschnick
1998 Leah Rabin
1999 Archbishop Henryk Muszyński, Gniezno
2000 Johannes Rau
2001 Schule ohne Rassismus - Schule mit Courage (School without Racism - School with Courage)
2002 Edna Brocke, Essen / Rolf Rendtorff, Karben / Johann Baptist Metz, Münster
2003 Joschka Fischer
2004 Daniel Barenboim
2005 Peter von der Osten-Sacken
2006 Leon de Winter and the Show Your Face! Association
2007 Esther Schapira and Georg M. Hafner
2008 Stef Wertheimer
2009 Erich Zenger
2010 Daniel Libeskind
2011 Navid Kermani
2012 Nikolaus Schneider
2013 Mirjam Pressler, Landshut / Fritz-Bauer-Institut, Frankfurt a.M.
2014 Gyorgy Konrád, Budapest
2015 Hanspeter Heinz, Augsburg / Gesprächskreis "Juden und Christen" beim Zentralkomitee der deutschen Katholiken, Bonn
2016 Micha Brumlik

See also
Gesellschaft für Christlich-Jüdische Zusammenarbeit Kassel (Society for Christian-Jewish Cooperation Kassel)
Authorship of the Bible
List of religion-related awards

External links 
 Buber-Rosenzweig Medal homepage (in German)
 DKR homepage (in German)
 History of Buber Rosenzweig (in German)

Jewish German history
Jewish Austrian history
German awards
Religion-related awards
Awards established in 1968
Christian and Jewish interfaith dialogue
1968 establishments in Germany
Christian orders, decorations, and medals